Abraham Henry Schenck (January 22, 1775 – June 1, 1831) was a U.S. Representative from New York. He was an uncle to Isaac Teller, who also became a representative from New York.

Born in Matteawan, New York, Schenck received an English education. He became engaged in the manufacture of machinery. He served as member of the New York State Assembly from 1804 to 1806. He was a slaveholder.

Schenck was elected as a Democratic-Republican to the Fourteenth Congress (March 4, 1815 – March 3, 1817). He engaged in the manufacture of cotton goods. He died in Fishkill, New York, June 1, 1831, and was interred in the Dutch Reform Churchyard, Beacon (formerly Fishkill Landing), New York.

References

Sources

1775 births
1831 deaths
Members of the New York State Assembly
People from Beacon, New York
Democratic-Republican Party members of the United States House of Representatives from New York (state)